The Evangelical United Brethren Church in Fullerton, Nebraska, at 501 Broadway St., was built in 1900. It was listed on the National Register of Historic Places in 2013.

It is an L-plan church with its steeple in the L.  It is Late Gothic Revival in style.

It has also been known as the United Evangelical Church, as "E" United Methodist Church, and as the Nance County Historical Society Museum.

References

External links

Museums in Nance County, Nebraska
Churches in Nebraska
National Register of Historic Places in Nance County, Nebraska
Gothic Revival architecture in Nebraska
Churches completed in 1900
History museums in Nebraska